Howard Elis Brown was a merchant and politician from Ontario, Canada. He represented the provincial riding of Welland as a Co-operative Commonwealth Federation (Ontario Section) member of the Legislative Assembly of Ontario from 1943 to 1945. He unsuccessfully contested the federal riding of Haldimand as a Co-operative Commonwealth Federation candidate in the 1949 federal election.

References

External links
 

Year of birth missing
Year of death missing
Ontario Co-operative Commonwealth Federation MPPs
20th-century Canadian legislators
Ontario candidates for Member of Parliament